The 1920–21 Prima Categoria season was won by Pro Vercelli.

Regulation
Struggles between minor and major clubs continued, more, they went out of control. The regional FAs expanded the championship to 64 clubs. The preliminary regional phase became the bulk of the tournament, with even sixteen matchdays and regular regional football champions, while the following national phase was reduced to a spring tournament of eight matchdays.

The main tournament was completely divided in five independent sections, and each region had its own football champions. The spots to the national championship were divided according to the agreements between the Regional FAs.

National championship was split in four groups of four clubs. Group winners advanced to the final four. The whole tournament could have twenty-two matchdays.

The experimental Southern groups had their own special regulations.

Teams
Regional FAs agreed to expand the league to 64 clubs. They variously chose to promote, re-elect, or invite clubs to fill the spots they had been granted to.

Pre-league qualifications

Liguria

Round 1

Round 2

Verdicts
Rivarolese and Sestrese were admitted to the 1a Categoria.

Northern Italy

Qualifications

Liguria

Classification

Rivarolese was demoted by the Federazione Italiana Giuoco Calcio after incidents caused by its supporters during the match Rivarolese-Savona (0-2). Rivarolese's remaining matches were all considered forfeits. The side was readmitted to the championship for the following season.

Results table

Piedmont

Group A
Classification

Results Table

Leadership playoff
Played on 13 March 1921 in Alessandria.

Group B
Classification

Results Table

Qualification playoff
Played on 20 February 1921 in Vercelli.

Repetition
Played on 20 March 1921 in Vercelli.

US Torinese qualified for the Northern Italy semifinals. Casale resigned from the FIGC.

Regional final
Played on 20 March 1921 in Turin.

Alessandria Champions of Piedmont 1921

Lombardy

Group A
Classification

Results Table

Group B
Classification

Results Table

Group C
Classification

Results Table

Relegation playoff
Played on 5 December 1920 in Busto Arsizio.

Group D
Classification

Results Table

Relegation playoff
Played on 5 December 1920 in Saronno.

The match was voided due to irregularities.

Repetition
Played on 19 December 1920 in Saronno.

Group E
Classification

Results Table

Group F
Classification

Results Table

Final round
Classification

Results Table

Veneto

Group A
Classification

Results Table
 The home teams are read down the left hand side while the away teams are indicated along the top.

Group B
Classification

Results Table
 The home teams are read down the left hand side while the away teams are indicated along the top.

Relegation playoff
Played on 27 February 1921 in Padua.

Final round
Classification

Results Table
 The home teams are read down the left hand side while the away teams are indicated along the top.

Emilia

Group A
Classification

Results table

Group B
Classification

Results table

Regional Finals
Played on 6 February and 13 March 1921 to determine Emilia's regional champion.

Since the aggregate rule wasn't applied, a tie-breaker was needed.

Tie-breaker
Played on 3 April 1921 in Ferrara.

Qualification play-off
Played on 2 and 20 February 1921.

Relegation playoff
Played on ? in ?.

Semifinals

Group A

Classification

Results table

Group B

Classification

Results table

Qualification playoff
Played on 3 July 1921 in Milan.

Group C

Classification

Results table

Qualification play-off
Played on 26 June 1921 in Vercelli.

A tie-breaker was due, but both Legnano and Torino decided to retire from the championship and to resign from the FIGC.

Group D

Classification

Results table

Finals

Round 1
Played on 10 July 1921 in Turin.

Bologna F.C. advanced directly to Round 2 due to Torino and Legnano's retirement. Alessandria resigned from the FIGC.

Round 2
Played on 17 July 1921 in Livorno.

Bologna resigned from the FIGC.

Southern Italy tournament

An experimental amatorial tournament was played in Southern Italy.

Final round
Played on 3 July 1921 in Bologna.

Livorno resigned from the FIGC.

National final
Played on 24 July 1921 in Turin.

Both teams resigned from the FIGC.

Footnotes

References and sources
Almanacco Illustrato del Calcio - La Storia 1898-2004, Panini Edizioni, Modena, September 2005

 
1921